Realness is the eighth studio album from singer and drag queen RuPaul. It was released on March 2, 2015 and is RuPaul's first album to feature a Parental Advisory warning label. The album was released to coincide with the seventh season premiere of RuPaul's Drag Race, which premiered the same day as the album's release. The album features guest appearances from Michelle Visage, Rebecca Romijn and Dave Audé, among others. Upon its release, the album charted at number 6 on the Billboard Dance/Electronic Albums, and 38 on the Independent Albums. The album sees RuPaul reuniting with producer Eric Kupper, producer of his debut album Supermodel of the World.

Background
Realness was first mentioned in a Billboard interview with RuPaul on February 24, 2015, in which he commented on the titles meaning, saying "when drag talks about realness, it's always with a wink because, you know, here I am, a drag queen talking about looking and feeling real, which is the joke itself." Sonically, the album is heavily influenced by 1990s House music and diva house. The album was released for pre-order later, and eventually released on March 2, 2015.

Track listing
Adapted from iTunes metadata.

Charts

Release history

References

2015 albums
RuPaul albums
Albums produced by Lucian Piane
Deep house albums